The 2005 Letran Knights men's basketball team represented Colegio de San Juan de Letran in the 81st season of the National Collegiate Athletic Association in the Philippines. The men's basketball tournament for the school year 2005-06 began on June 25, 2005, and the host school for the season was also Letran.

The Knights, after a disappointing Season 80 campaign, finished the double round-robin eliminations at first place with 13 wins against 1 loss. They then eliminated San Sebastian Stags in the Final Four to face their Season 80 Final Four tormentors, the PCU Dolphins, in the Finals.

The Knights went on to defeat the Dolphins in three games to capture their 16th NCAA championship. Boyet Bautista was named Finals Most Valuable Player and Aaron Aban was named Most Improved Player of the season.

Roster 

 Depth chart Depth chart

NCAA Season 81 games results 

Elimination games were played in a double round-robin format. All games were aired on Studio 23.

Source: NCAA.org.ph

Awards

NCAA Individual Awards

NCAA Players of the Week

References 

Letran Knights basketball team seasons